is a Japanese footballer who plays for FK Auda in Latvia.

Career
In 2019, Seiya joined Latvian club FK Auda in the Latvian First League.

References

External links
 
 

Japanese footballers
1997 births
Living people
Ekstraklasa players
Pogoń Szczecin players
MKP Pogoń Siedlce players
FK Auda players
Expatriate footballers in Poland
Expatriate footballers in Latvia
Association football forwards